Kenta Fujii (born 4 April 1994 in Suzuka) is a Japanese Grand Prix motorcycle racer. He currently competes in the All Japan Road Race J-GP3 Championship aboard a Honda NSF250R. He has previously competed in the MFJ All Japan Road Race GPMono Championship, the MFJ All Japan Road Race GP125 Championship, the MFJ All Japan Road Race J-GP3 Championship and the Spanish CEV Moto3 Championship. Fujii won the GPMono title in 2010, and the J-GP3 title in 2011.

Career statistics
2008- 2nd, All Japan GPMono Championship #51 Honda
2009- 17th, All Japan GP125 Championship #51 TSR KTM / 3rd, All Japan GPMono Championship #3 TSR KTM
2010- 12th, All Japan J-GP3 Championship #17 Honda RS125R / 1st, All Japan GPMono Championship #3 TSR Honda
2011- 1st, All Japan J-GP3 Championship #12 Honda NSF250R / 2nd, All Japan GPMono Championship #1 TSR Honda
2012- NC, Moto3 World Championship #51 TSR Honda
2013- 18th, CEV Moto3 Championship #51 TSR Honda
2014- NC, CEV Moto3 Championship #51    TSR Honda
2017- 1st, All Japan Road Race JP250 Championship #90    Honda CBR250RR
2018-  All Japan Road Race J-GP3 Championship #090    Honda NSF250R

By season

Races by year
(key)

References

External links

1994 births
Living people
Japanese motorcycle racers
Moto3 World Championship riders
Sportspeople from Mie Prefecture